Svetlanas are a Russian thrashcore and punk rock band formed in Moscow, Russia and based in Milan, Italy. Its current lineup consists of Olga Svetlanas on lead vocals, Ricky on guitar, Steve on bass, and Diste, Olga's husband, on drums. Bassist Nick Oliveri frequently appears on the band's releases.

History 
Svetlanas originated in Russia in 2009. Their self-titled debut album was released a year later in 2010. The lineup has changed since the formation of the band but has now remained constant, as of January 2018.

Band members 
Olga Svetlanas – vocals
Ricky – lead guitar
Steve Svetlanas – bass
Diste Svetlanas – drums
Frequent collaborators
Nick Oliveri – bass, vocals

Discography

Albums 
Svetlanas (2010)
Tales from the Alpha Brigade (2013)
Naked Horse Rider (2015)
This Is Moscow Not L.A. (2017)
Disco Sucks (2020)

EPs 
KGB Session (2009)
East Meets West (2015)
Putin on da Hitz (2017)

Singles 
"Lose Control" (2017)

References 

Russian hardcore punk groups
Demons Run Amok Entertainment artists